Gap junction delta-2 protein (GJD2) also known as connexin-36 (Cx36) or gap junction alpha-9 protein (GJA9) is a protein that in humans is encoded by the GJD2 gene.

Function 

GJD2, also called connexin-36 (CX36), is a member of the connexin gene family that is expressed predominantly in mammalian neurons. Connexins associate in groups of 6 and are organized radially around a central pore to form connexons. Each gap junction intercellular channel is formed by the conjunction of 2 connexons. See GJB2 for additional background information on connexins.

References

Further reading

External links 
 

Connexins